The 2017 FIVB Volleyball Boys' U19 World Championship was the fifteenth edition of the FIVB Volleyball Boys' U19 World Championship, contested by the men's national teams under the age of 19 of the members of the FIVB, the sport's global governing body. The tournament was held in Riffa, Bahrain from 18 to 27 August 2017. 20 teams from the 5 confederations competed in the tournament.

Players must be born on or after 1 January 1999.

Iran won its second title in the competition, defeating Russia in the final. Japan defeated South Korea for the bronze medal. Amirhossein Esfandiar from Iran was elected the MVP.

Qualification
The FIVB Sports Events Council revealed a proposal to streamline the number of teams participating in the Age Group World Championships.

Pools composition
Teams were seeded in the first two positions of each pool following the serpentine system according to their FIVB U19 World Ranking as of January 2017. FIVB reserved the right to seed the hosts as head of pool A regardless of the U19 World Ranking. The twelve remaining teams were drawn in next three rows under the condition that there were not too much country in the same confederation were drawn in the same pool. The draw was held in Manama, Bahrain on 20 May 2017. Rankings are shown in brackets except the hosts who ranked 38th.

Draw

Squads

Venues
 Isa Sports City Hall C, Riffa, Bahrain – Pool A, B and Final round
 Isa Sports City Hall B, Riffa, Bahrain – Pool C, D and Final round

Pool standing procedure
 Number of matches won
 Match points
 Sets ratio
 Points ratio
 If the tie continues as per the point ratio between two teams, the priority will be given to the team which won the last match between them. When the tie in points ratio is between three or more teams, a new classification of these teams in the terms of points 1, 2 and 3 will be made taking into consideration only the matches in which they were opposed to each other.

Match won 3–0 or 3–1: 3 match points for the winner, 0 match points for the loser
Match won 3–2: 2 match points for the winner, 1 match point for the loser

Preliminary round
All times are Arabia Standard Time (UTC+03:00).

Pool A

|}

|}

Pool B

|}

|}

Pool C

|}

|}

Pool D

|}

|}

Final round
All times are Arabia Standard Time (UTC+03:00).

17th–20th places

|}

|}

Final sixteen

Round of 16

|}

9th–16th quarterfinals

|}

Quarterfinals

|}

13th–16th semifinals

|}

9th–12th semifinals

|}

5th–8th semifinals

|}

Semifinals

|}

15th place match

|}

13th place match

|}

11th place match

|}

9th place match

|}

7th place match

|}

5th place match

|}

3rd place match

|}

Final

|}

Final standing

Awards

Most Valuable Player
 Amirhossein Esfandiar
Best Setter
 Shunsuke Nakamura
Best Outside Spikers
 Amirhossein Esfandiar
 Pavel Tetyukhin

Best Middle Blockers
 Artem Melnikov
 Amir Hossein Toukhteh
Best Opposite Spiker
 Im Dong-hyeok
Best Libero
 Kenta Ichikawa

See also
2017 FIVB Volleyball Girls' U18 World Championship

References

External links
Official website
Final Standing
Awards
Statistics

FIVB Volleyball Boys' U19 World Championship
FIVB Volleyball Boys' U19 World Championship
International volleyball competitions hosted by Bahrain
2017 in Bahraini sport
FIVB Volleyball